is a Japanese actor, singer, and bassist associated with Himawari Theatre Group. He is the lead vocalist and bassist of the rock duo Bucks.

Personal life

On May 1, 2019, Shiota announced he and a non-celebrity woman had registered their marriage.

Filmography

Theatre

Film

References

External links
  

21st-century Japanese male actors
Japanese male stage actors
Living people
1990 births